Gelali or Golali or Galali may refer to:
 Gelali, Kermanshah
 Golali, Kuzaran, Kermanshah Province
 Gelali-ye Jadid, Kermanshah Province
 Galali, Kurdistan
 Golali, Zanjan